Ilkka may refer to:

 Ilkka (given name), Finnish given name
 Ilkka (newspaper), Finnish newspaper